Brox is a surname. It is used in Germany, Norway, Sweden, the USA and England, among other countries. 

Notable people with the surname include:

Brox Sisters, American trio of singing sisters, popular in the 1920s and early 1930s
Ottar Brox (born 1932), Norwegian authority in social science and a politician for the Socialist Left Party
Victor Brox (1940–2023), blues musician from Manchester, England

References